This is a list of islands on the Potomac River and its North and South branches. Because the Potomac belongs to Maryland, the majority of its islands lie within that state with some exceptions including portions located in the District of Columbia.

Potomac River

North Branch Potomac River

South Branch Potomac River

See also
List of islands of the United States
List of islands of Maryland

Potomac
Islands, Potomac